Ann Li (born June 26, 2000) is an American tennis player. She has a career-high ranking by the Women's Tennis Association (WTA) of No. 44 in the world, and was the runner-up at the 2017 Junior Wimbledon Championships.

Personal background
Li was born into a sports family. Her aunt was a professional speed skater in China. Her father played soccer in college, while her mother ran track in college.

Tennis career

2017
Li reached her first Junior Grand Slam singles final in 2017 at Wimbledon. In the first all-American girls' final since 1979, the unseeded Li lost to third seed Claire Liu, in three sets. Two weeks later, Li won her first professional title on the ITF Circuit, a $15k tournament in Evansville, Indiana.

2018
Li entered the Kentucky Championships where she defeated Renata Zarazúa, Julia Glushko, Anastasia Nefedova, Jessica Pegula before losing to Asia Muhammad, in straight sets.

She participated at the Koser Challenge where she defeated former British No. 1, Heather Watson, and Wimbledon finalist, Sabine Lisicki, but lost to Madison Brengle in the quarterfinals. In the ITF Templeton, she eliminated fellow wildcard Sophia Whittle but lost to Sofya Zhuk. She tried to qualify for the US Open but lost to Marie Bouzková. She then entered an ITF event in Texas where she lost to Naomi Broady. Her best result after the US Open was at the ITF Stockton where she beat Jovana Jaksic and Lauren Davis, before yet again falling to Madison Brengle. In Templeton, she won against Nicole Gibbs before losing to Hailey Baptiste.

2020: Grand Slam debut, US Open third round, top 100 debut
At the Australian Open, Li played in the main draw of a Grand Slam tournament for the first time, after winning all of her qualifying matches. She advanced to the second round, where she lost to the eventual champion, Sofia Kenin.

Li reached a Grand Slam third round for the first time in her career at the US Open defeating 13th seed Alison Riske. She reached the top 100 at world No. 97, on 9 November 2020.

2021: Australian Open third round, maiden title, top 50 debut
Li reached a third round of a Grand Slam championship for the second time at the Australian Open. She then lost to seventh seed Aryna Sabalenka.

Li won her maiden WTA title at the Tenerife Ladies Open, defeating Camila Osorio in the final in straight sets. With this title, her ranking rose into the top 50 for the first time, reaching a new career-high of world No. 48, on 25 October 2021. Due to her rise, in November, she was nominated on the list for the “2021 WTA Newcomer of the Year”.

Personal life
Both of Li's parents are Chinese. In her spare time, she enjoys playing the ukulele.

Performance timeline

Only main-draw results in WTA Tour, Grand Slam tournaments, Fed Cup/Billie Jean King Cup, and Olympic Games are included in win–loss records.

Singles
Current after the 2023 Indian Wells Open.

Doubles

WTA career finals

Singles: 2 (1 title, 1 runner-up)

ITF Circuit finals

Singles: 8 (3 titles, 5 runner-ups)

Doubles: 2 (2 runner-ups)

Junior Grand Slam tournament finals

Singles: 1 (1 runner-up)

Top 10 wins

Notes

References

External links
 
 
 
 

2000 births
Living people
American female tennis players
People from Upper Merion Township, Pennsylvania
Tennis people from Pennsylvania
American sportspeople of Chinese descent
Chinese-American tennis players
21st-century American women